The 2016–17 UC Santa Barbara Gauchos men's basketball team represented the University of California, Santa Barbara during the 2016–17 NCAA Division I men's basketball season. The Gauchos, led by 19th-year head coach Bob Williams, played their home games at the UC Santa Barbara Events Center, nicknamed the Thunderdome, as members of the Big West Conference.

They finished the season 6–22, 4–12 in Big West play to finish in last place. They failed to qualify for the Big West tournament.

On March 9, 2017, the school informed head coach Bob Williams that he would not return as head coach. Williams finished his 19-year career at the school as the school's all-time winningest coach with a record of 313–260. On March 30, it was announced that Arizona associate head coach and former New Orleans head coach Joe Pasternack had been hired as the next head coach.

Previous season 
The Gauchos finished the 2015–16 season 19–14, 11–5 in Big West play to finish in fourth place. They defeated UC Davis in the Big West tournament losing to Hawaii in the semifinals. They were invited to the inaugural Vegas 16 tournament, which only had eight teams, where they defeated Northern Illinois to advance to the semifinals where they lost to Old Dominion.

Departures

Incoming transfers

2016 incoming recruits

2017 incoming recruits

Roster

Schedule and results

|-
!colspan=9 style=| Exhibition 

|-
!colspan=9 style=| Non-conference regular season

|-
!colspan=9 style=| Big West Conference regular season

|-

References

UC Santa Barbara Gauchos men's basketball seasons
UC Santa Barbara
UC Santa Barbara Gauchos men's basketball team
UC Santa Barbara Gauchos men's basketball team